The Eniak Antique is an automobile built in Argentina by Eniak beginning in 1983. The Eniak company had hitherto mainly focused on electronics, some of which found their way into cars. The Antique was a metal-bodied, fiberglass-bumpers and doors, two-seat roadster that took its styling cues from the classic sports cars of the thirties, with some resemblance to the Alfa Romeo 8C. The engines came from the Volkswagen 1500 (originally a Hillman Avenger unit) and were tuned by Balestrini. The round gauges on the dashboard were of Eniak's own manufacture, and a traditional looking large four-spoke wooden steering wheel finished the job. A few cars were shipped to Japan in 1988, but Eniak still had to shut its doors in 1989.

External links
 Argentinian Eniak Antique registry (in Spanish)

References

Cars of Argentina
Retro-style automobiles
Cars introduced in 1983
Cars discontinued in 1989